Hartt is a surname. Notable people with the surname include:

 Cecil Hartt (1884–1930), Australian cartoonist
 Charles Frederick Hartt (1840–1878), Canadian-American geologist, paleontologist and naturalist
 Dale Hartt (born 1979), American mixed martial artist
 Edmund Hartt, American shipbuilder
 James Irwin Hartt (1867 – after 1919), Canadian politician
 Frederick Hartt (1914–1991), American art historian
 Maurice Hartt (1895–1950), Romanian-born Canadian politician
 Reg Hartt (born 1946), Canadian film archivist and critic
 Rollin Lynde Hartt (1869–1946), American journalist
 Stanley Hartt (1937–2018), Canadian lawyer and businessman
 Thomas Aaron Hartt (1858–1930), Canadian politician

Hartt may also refer to:

 The Hartt School, the comprehensive performing arts conservatory of the University of Hartford located in West Hartford, Connecticut, United States, that offers degree programs in music, dance, and theatre